Darreh-ye Bizhan-e Vosta (also Romanized as Darreh-ye Bīzhan-e Vosţá) is a village in Beyranvand-e Jonubi Rural District, Bayravand District, Khorramabad County, Lorestan Province, Iran. At the 2006 census, its population was 171, in 34 families.

References 

Towns and villages in Khorramabad County